Christmas Memories is a 1987 compilation Christmas album by Christian singer Evie released on Word Records. It is a collection of Christmas songs that Evie has recorded from her two Christmas albums Come On, Ring Those Bells (1977) and Christmas, A Happy Time (1984), plus she has recorded four new songs for this collection. The songs from Come On, Ring Those Bells were remixed and remastered by Greg Nelson and Jim Scheffler. Christmas Memories debuted and peaked at number 17 on the Billboard Top Inspirational Albums chart.

Track listing

Note: (*) - tracks produced by Lennart Sjöholm; (**) - tracks produced by Pelle Karlsson; (***) - tracks produced by Greg Nelson.

Charts

References

1987 Christmas albums
Word Records albums